Goutam Ghose (also spelled Gautam Ghosh born 24 July 1950) is an Indian film director, Actor, music director and cinematographer, who works primarily in Bengali cinema. He is the only Indian to have received the "Vittorio Di Sica" Award, Italy, in 1997. 

In 2012, the Government of West Bengal honored him with the Banga Bibhushan for lifetime achievement. Acknowledging his contributions to film, he was awarded the Knighthood of the Star of the Italian Solidarity in July 2006.

Early life 
Goutam Ghose was born on 24 July 1950 in Calcutta, India to Santana and Prof. Himangshu Kumar Ghose. His kindergarten days began at the St John's Diocesan School (now an all-girls school). He studied there till class 4 and then moved to the neighboring Cathedral Missionary Boys' School. He graduated from the University of Calcutta.

Career 
He started making documentaries in 1973. Took active part in group theatre movement in Calcutta. Also dedicated some time as a Photojournalist. Made his first documentary– New Earth in 1973 followed by Hungry Autumn. Since then, he has made a number of feature films and documentaries. Ghose was greatly influenced by the movie of Akira Kurosawa, Satyajit Ray, Ritwik Ghatak, Rajen Tarafdar, Mrinal Sen and Ajoy Kar who had heralded a new era in Bengali movie through his works.

His most successful films were Padma Nadir Majhi, Kaalbela and Moner Manush. He becomes limelight for those Movie.

Filmography

{| class="wikitable sortable" 
|+ Documentary
!Year
!Title
!Language
!Director
|-
|1973||New Earth||English ||
|-
|1974||Hungry Autumn||English ||
|-
|1986||The Land of Sand Dunes||English ||
|-
|1989||Sange Meel Se Mulaqat||Hindi ||
|-
||1996||Beyond the Himaylayas||English ||
|-
|1999||Ray: life and work||Bengali ||
|-
|2004||Impermanance||Hindi ||
|-
|2012||L'archivio a oriente||Italian, Persian, Chinese ||
|}

 Awards and recognitions Hungry Autumn (A documentary) : 
Main Award, Oberhausen Film Festival (1978)Land of Sand Dunes (A documentary): 
 National Film Award for Best Non-Feature Film (1986)Meeting a Milestone (A documentary): 
Special screening at the Cannes Film Festival, (out of competition)

Maa Bhoomi:	
NANDI State Award for Best Film
 National Film Award for Best Feature Film in Telugu (1979)

Dakhal: 
National Film Award for Best Feature Film (1982)
Silver Medal at Figuera De Foz, Portugal (1982)
Ecumenical Jury Prize for Human Rights Festival at Strasbourg, France (1982)

Paar:		
National Film Award for Best Feature Film in Hindi(1985)
UNESCO Award at Venice Film Festival (1985) 
FIPRESCI Award, Red Cross Award at Verna Film Festival (1987).
Filmfare Award for Best Direction and Best Screenplay

Antarjali Jatra:	
National Film Award for Best Feature Film in Bengali(1987)
Un-Certain Regards, Cannes Film Festival (1988)
Grand Prix - Golden Semurg at Tashkent Film Festival (1988)

Padma Nadir Majhi:	
National Film Award for Best Direction (1992)
National Film Award for Second Best Feature Film (1992).
UNESCO Award, Cannes Film Festival (1993).

Patang:	
National Film Award for Best Feature Film in Hindi (1993)Beyond the Himalayas (A documentary): 
Filmfare Award for Best Documentary

Gudia: 	
National Film Award for Best Feature Film in Hindi (1996)
Un-Certain Regards, Cannes Film Festival (1997)

Dekha: 	
National Film Award for Best Feature Film in Bengali (2001)
Silver Balloon Award, Nantes Film FestivalKalahandi (A documentary):

National Film Award for Best Investigative Film (2002)A Treasure in the Snow (A documentary):

National Film Award for Best Promotional Film (2003)

Abar Aranye: 	
National Film Award for Best Direction
National Film Award for Best ScreenplayImpermanence (A documentary): 
Premiered at the Venice International Film Festival (2004)

Yatra: 
National Film Award for Best Cinematography	

Moner Manush:
Nargis Dutt Award for Best Feature Film on National Integration (A National award)
Golden Peacock for Best Film at the 41st International Film Festival of India held at Goa.

Shankhachil:
National Film Award for Best Feature Film in Bengali
41st Bangladesh National Film Awards for Best Actress, Best child Artist and Best art Direction. 
Montreal World Film Festival For Nominate

Special Awards:
	
Is the only Indian to have received the "Vittorio Di Sica" Award, Italy, 1997
Was awarded the Knighthood of the "Star of the Italian Solidarity" in July 2006
Awarded the Banga Bibhushan for lifetime achievement in film direction in 2012
UNESCO Award (1985) 
 won Kalakar Awards
Honours
In 2017, he was inducted as a member of the Oscar Academy

 As an avant-garde poet 
Ghose has portrayed the role of a Hungry generation poet in Srijit Mukherji's film Baishe Srabon'' (2011) and also penned the poems of the character he played.

References

External links 
 
 

1950 births
Bengali film directors
Bengali Hindus
20th-century Indian film directors
Living people
Film directors from Kolkata
University of Calcutta alumni
Filmfare Awards winners
Kalakar Awards winners
Best Cinematography National Film Award winners
Indian documentary filmmakers
Hindi film cinematographers
21st-century Indian film directors
Best Director National Film Award winners
Cinematographers from West Bengal
Best Original Screenplay National Film Award winners
Directors who won the Best Feature Film National Film Award
Directors who won the Best Film on National Integration National Film Award